Jeffrey B. Fager (born December 10, 1954) is an American television producer who is the former chairman of CBS News and former executive producer of 60 Minutes.

Biography
Fager was born in Wellesley, Massachusetts, to an Episcopalian family, the son of Margaret (née Bulkley) and Charles Anthony Fager. He graduated from Colgate University in 1977. He began his career in broadcast news in Boston and joined CBS News in 1982 from San Francisco, California, CBS affiliate KPIX-TV, where he was a broadcast producer.

Fager was Executive Producer of the CBS Evening News from 1996 to 1998 and held senior and field producer positions for that and other CBS News programs, including 60 Minutes. He left the Evening News in 1998 to become the first executive producer of 60 Minutes II.  In June 2004, he assumed the position of Executive Producer of 60 Minutes.

In February 2011, it was announced that Fager would lead the news division of CBS as Chairman of CBS News, a newly created position. In tandem with the newly appointed president, David Rhodes, Fager would head CBS News while continuing to executive produce 60 Minutes.

After stepping in as Chairman of CBS News, Fager said he would "restore CBS News to where it should be, where it needs to be", using the original reporting and storytelling of 60 Minutes as a benchmark for its other news programs.

On January 1, 2015, Fager stepped down as chairman but continued in his executive producer role of 60 Minutes until his 2018 departure from CBS News. David Rhodes continued to serve as President of the CBS News Division.

Personal life
Fager is married to Melinda Wooster; they live in New Canaan, Connecticut, with their three children.

Controversy
In 2018, nineteen current and former CBS employees told The New Yorker that Fager allowed harassment in the news division. Six former employees also told the magazine that while inebriated at company parties, he touched employees in ways that made them uncomfortable.

Fager was ousted from CBS News on September 12, 2018. CBS News reported that Fager had sent a threatening text message to Jericka Duncan, one of the network's correspondents, when she sought his response to the report in The New Yorker.

Awards
 2007: Gerald Loeb Award for Television Enterprise business journalism for "The Mother of All Heists"
 2012: Paul White Award, Radio Television Digital News Association
 2014: Gerald Loeb Award for Personal Finance business journalism for "60 Minutes: 40 Million Mistakes"

References

External links

Television producers from New York (state)
Living people
Colgate University alumni
1954 births
CBS executives
Gerald Loeb Award winners for Television
Gerald Loeb Award winners for Personal Finance
Presidents of CBS News
American television news producers
60 Minutes producers